Borka Majstorović Malčić (born 5 June 1983) is a Serbian former professional tennis player.

Majstorović, a Slovenian born player raised in Novi Sad, represented Yugoslavia in three Fed Cup ties in 1999, as a singles player. She reached her career best singles ranking of 424 in 2003 and finished up on tour the following year.

Now known by her married name Borka Malčić, she works as an academic in the field of pedagogy.

ITF finals

Doubles: 3 (0–3)

References

External links
 
 
 

1983 births
Living people
Serbian female tennis players
Serbia and Montenegro female tennis players
Sportspeople from Novi Sad